Port Washington North is a village in Nassau County, on the North Shore of Long Island, in New York, United States. It is considered part of the Greater Port Washington area, which is anchored by Port Washington. The population was 3,154 at the 2010 census.

The Incorporated Village of Port Washington North is located on the Cow Neck Peninsula, within the Town of North Hempstead.

History 
Port Washington North incorporated in 1932 after residents of the area unanimously voted in favor of incorporating on July 6 of that year. Its first Mayor, John Cocks, led the movement to incorporate; he was elected on August 2, 1932.

In 1931, one year prior to Port Washington North incorporating itself as a village, the adjacent village, Manorhaven, unsuccessfully attempted to annex the area. Manorhaven was unsuccessful due to the fact that the residents in what would ultimately become Port Washington North preferred incorporating as a separate village.

In 1953, an area of sand mine along Cow Neck Road, which was uninhabited, was annexed by the village.

By the late 1950s, the Colonial Sand and Gravel Company began selling tracts of their land to developers. In 1959, the green light was given by the village for developers to begin constructing the first section of Port Washington North's Soundview Village subdivision.

In 1982, the Village of Port Washington North celebrated its 50th Anniversary.

The name of the village reflects its geographic location in the northern part of the Greater Port Washington area.

Geography

Port Washington North is located within the Manhasset Bay Watershed, which in turn is located within the larger Long Island Sound/Atlantic Ocean Watershed.

Demographics

2010 census 
As of the census of 2010, there were 3,154 people residing in the village. The racial makeup of the village was 86.43% White, 1.62% African American, 8.34% Asian, 2.12% from other races, and 1.40% from two or more races. Hispanic or Latino of any race were 6.34% of the population.

Census 2000 
As of the census of 2000, there were 2,700 people, 1,063 households, and 767 families residing in the village. The population density was 5,624.8 people per square mile (2,171.8/km2). There were 1,071 housing units at an average density of 2,231.2 per square mile (861.5/km2). The racial makeup of the village was 86.78% White, 1.15% African American, 0.04% Native American, 9.15% Asian, 1.00% from other races, and 1.89% from two or more races. Hispanic or Latino of any race were 6.30% of the population.

There were 1,063 households, out of which 31.7% had children under the age of 18 living with them, 61.8% were married couples living together, 7.6% had a female householder with no husband present, and 27.8% were non-families. 24.4% of all households were made up of individuals, and 10.3% had someone living alone who was 65 years of age or older. The average household size was 2.53 and the average family size was 2.99.

In the village, the population was spread out, with 22.7% under the age of 18, 4.8% from 18 to 24, 28.8% from 25 to 44, 29.0% from 45 to 64, and 14.7% who were 65 years of age or older. The median age was 41 years. For every 100 females, there were 94.9 males. For every 100 females age 18 and over, there were 92.1 males.

The median income for a household in the village was $89,287, and the median income for a family was $100,730. Males had a median income of $75,427 versus $52,315 for females. The per capita income for the village was $46,378. About 4.1% of families and 5.5% of the population were below the poverty line, including 4.5% of those under age 18 and 2.1% of those age 65 or over.

Government

Village government 

As of August 2021, the Mayor of Port Washington North is Robert Weitzner and the Village Trustees are Steven Cohen, Matthew Kepke, Michael Malatino, and Sherman Scheff.

Representation in higher government

Town representation 
Port Washington North is located in the Town of North Hempstead's 6th Council district, which as of August 2022 is represented on the North Hempstead Town Council by Mariann Dalimonte (D – Port Washington).

Nassau County representation 
Port Washington North is located in Nassau County's 11th Legislative district, which as of August 2022 is represented in the Nassau County Legislature by Delia DiRiggi-Whitton (D–Glen Cove).

New York State representation

New York State Assembly 
Port Washington North is located within the New York State Assembly's 16th Assembly district, which as of August 2022 is represented by Gina Sillitti (D–Manorhaven).

New York State Senate 
Port Washington North is located in the New York State Senate's 7th State Senate district, which as of August 2022 is represented in the New York State Senate by Anna Kaplan (D–North Hills).

Federal representation

United States Congress 
Port Washington North is located in New York's 3rd congressional district, which as of August 2022 is represented in the United States Congress by Tom Suozzi (D–Glen Cove).

United States Senate 
Like the rest of New York, Port Washington North is represented in the United States Senate by Charles Schumer (D) and Kirsten Gillibrand (D).

Politics 
In the 2016 U.S. presidential election, the majority of Port Washington North voters voted for Hillary Clinton (D).

Parks and recreation 

 Bay Walk Park – A Village-owned park and promenade along Manhasset Bay, featuring the village's Nautical Art Museum.
 Mill Pond Park – A Town-owned park around and including Mill Pond.

Education

School district 
The Village of Port Washington North is located entirely within the boundaries of the Port Washington Union Free School District. As such, all children who reside within Port Washington North and attend public schools go to Port Washington's schools.

Library district 
Port Washington North is located within the boundaries of the Port Washington Library District.

Infrastructure

Transportation

Road 
Major roads in Port Washington North include Cow Neck Road, Middle Neck Road, Mill Pond Road, Radcliff Avenue, Soundview Drive, and Shore Road/Sands Point Road.

Bus 
As of August 2021, Port Washington North is served by two Nassau Inter-County Express bus routes: the n23 and the Port Washington Shuttle.

Utilities

Natural gas 
National Grid USA provides natural gas to homes and businesses that are hooked up to natural gas lines in Port Washington North.

Power 
PSEG Long Island provides power to all homes and businesses within Port Washington North.

Sewage 
Port Washington North is located within the Port Washington Water Pollution Control District, which operates the sanitary sewer system serving the village.

Water 
Port Washington North is located within the boundaries of the Port Washington Water District, which provides the entirety of Port Washington North with water.

References

External links

 Official website

Town of North Hempstead, New York
Villages in New York (state)
Long Island Sound
Villages in Nassau County, New York
Populated coastal places in New York (state)